Bouboulina is a 1959 Greek drama film directed and written by Kostas Andritsos and starring Irene Papas as Laskarina Bouboulina, Koula Agagiotou, Andreas Barkoulis and Dionysis Papagiannopoulos.  The film features the heroine of the Greek Revolutionary of 1821 Laskarina Bouboulina.

Plot

Cast

Irene Papas as Laskarina Bouboulina
Koula Agagiotou
Andreas Barkoulis as Dimitros Giannouzas
Gikas Biniaris
Giorgos Foras
Vassilis Kanakis
Nikos Kourkoulos as Giagos Giannouzas
Artemis Matsas
Miranda Myrat as Skevo Pinotsi
Christoforos Nezer as Panagos
Giorgos Olibios
Dionysis Papagiannopoulos
Koulis Stoligkas or Stoligas as Nikolios
Nikos Tsahridis
Grigoris Vafias
Georgia Vassiliadou as Paraskevoula
Giorgos Velentzas
Lefteris Vournas

Historical Context

Bouboulina 1959 Is set during the Greek Revolution of 1821 against the occupying Ottoman Empire and its Sultan Mahmud II (1808-1839). The Ottoman Empire was caught off guard and reacted in disbelief that the Greeks would stage an unprovoked revolt against its far greater occupant. Women played a crucial role in the revolution, most notably in the town of Mani located in the coast of Southern Greece where out of 1500 combatants fending off an Egyptian and Turkish attack, 1000 were women. Laskarina Bouboulina remains the most famed female revolutionary fighter. She participated in numerous naval sieges as well as horseback battles on land.

References

External links

 Bouboulina at Cine.gr 

1959 films
1950s Greek-language films
Films set in Greece
Works about the Greek War of Independence
1950s biographical drama films
Greek biographical drama films